Sandra Voe (born 6 October 1936) is a Scottish actress of film, television, and theatre.

Career

Television and films 

Voe began her on screen career in 1966, appearing in an episode of Dr. Finlay's Casebook. She has also appeared in Coronation Street, London's Burning, Taggart, Casualty, Monarch of the Glen, The Bill, Midsomer Murders, and Shetland.

Her film credits include Breaking the Waves, Felicia's Journey and Vera Drake.

Theatre 

Voe has worked in theatres all over the UK, including Sheffield Crucible, Leicester Phoenix, Leicester Haymarket, Oxford Playhouse, Birmingham Rep, Manchester Royal Exchange, West Yorkshire Playhouse, Nottingham Playhouse, Bristol Old Vic, Bloomsbury, Hampstead, Lyric Hammersmith, Almeida, Bush, Shared Experience, RNT, Royal Court and Ambassadors.

Her theatre performances include:

 Romeo and Juliet
 Mother Courage
 The Nightingale Sang
 The Government Inspector
 Donna Rosita
 Saturday Sunday Monday
 Medea
 The Winter Guest
 A Delicate Balance
 Trouble Sleeping
 Three Sisters
 The Daughter-in-Law
 Marriage
 False Admissions

 Successful Strategies
 The Comedy Without Title
 Landmarks
 The Seagull
 Nana
 Blisters
 The Birthday Party
 The Strangeness of Others
 The Deep Blue Sea
 The Kitchen
 Attempts of her Life
 Henry V
 The Girl With Red Hair
 The Vertical Line

Radio

Personal life

Voe was born Sandra Williamson in the Shetland Islands, Scotland, one of eight siblings.
She was married to actor Rex Doyle until his death in 2015, and they have 2 children, including Candida Doyle (Pulp). She is the aunt of singer Astrid Williamson.

Filmography

References

External links 

 
 

Living people
Scottish film actresses
Scottish stage actresses
Scottish television actresses
People from Shetland
1936 births